The term Scanian (or ) can refer to:

 A person born or living in the province of Scania proper (Skåne)
 The people and language of the historical provinces of Scania (Terrae Scaniae, Skånelandene (Danish), Skåneland (Swedish)
 Scanian dialect, the dialect spoken in Scania
 Scanian Law, the law of the historical provinces of Scania